Bozzole is a comune (municipality) in the Province of Alessandria in the Italian region Piedmont, located about  east of Turin and about  north of Alessandria.

Bozzole borders the following municipalities: Pomaro Monferrato, Sartirana Lomellina, Torre Beretti e Castellaro, Valenza, and Valmacca.

Demographic evolution

References

Cities and towns in Piedmont